The Kirstein Building is a historic industrial and commercial building located in Rochester in Monroe County, New York. It is a six-story, large triangular yellow brick structure with Classical Revival details. It was built in 1908 for E. Kirstein and Sons, Co., later Shuron Optical Company, a manufacturer of optical products. The company continued to use the building for offices and production until 1965.

It was listed on the National Register of Historic Places on October 4, 1985.

References

External links

Commercial buildings in Rochester, New York
Commercial buildings on the National Register of Historic Places in New York (state)
Neoclassical architecture in New York (state)
Commercial buildings completed in 1908
Industrial buildings completed in 1908
Industrial buildings and structures on the National Register of Historic Places in New York (state)
National Register of Historic Places in Rochester, New York
1908 establishments in New York (state)
Industrial buildings and structures in Rochester, New York